For information on all Florida Atlantic University sports, see Florida Atlantic Owls

The Florida Atlantic Owls men's soccer team is a varsity intercollegiate athletic team of Florida Atlantic University in Boca Raton, Florida, United States. As of the upcoming 2022 season, the team is a member of the NCAA Division I American Athletic Conference (The American). FAU's first men's soccer team was fielded in 1980. The team plays its home games at FAU Soccer Stadium in Boca Raton. The Owls are coached by Joey Worthen.

The Owls' most successful achievement in their history came in 2004, where they finished as co-regular season champions of the Atlantic Sun Conference. In 2007, the Owls won the Atlantic Soccer Conference Tournament, although it does not have a binding NCAA birth. Their strongest performance in the Atlantic Sun Men's Soccer Tournament came in 1997, 1999 and 2003, where the Owls reached the finals, but lost on all three occasions. In 2021, the Owls reached the finals of the 2021 Conference USA Men's Soccer Tournament bust lost to Kentucky in extra time. Florida Atlantic has never qualified for the NCAA Division I Men's Soccer Championship.

FAU's most recent conference change was announced during the 2021–22 offseason, when it left Conference USA (C-USA) for The American. The decision of the Sun Belt Conference to reinstate its men's soccer league effective with the 2022 season dropped the C-USA men's soccer membership to four. Of these four schools, three, including FAU, were scheduled to move fully to The American in the near future, most likely in July 2023. Accordingly, The American brought all four remaining C-USA men's soccer teams into its own soccer league.

Roster 
As of August 5, 2022.

				

Captains in bold

Coaching history 
There have been five head coaches in FAU history.

Honors 
 Atlantic Sun Conference Regular Season
 Winners (1): 2004
 Atlantic Sun Men's Soccer Tournament
 Runners-up (3): 1997, 1999, 2003
 Atlantic Soccer Conference Tournament
 Winners (1): 2007
 Conference USA Men's Soccer Tournament
 Runners-up (1): 2021

References

External links 
 

 
1980 establishments in Florida
Association football clubs established in 1980